The 2013 Houston Baptist Huskies football team represented Houston Baptist University—now known as Houston Christian University—as an independent in the 2013 NCAA Division I FCS football season. The Huskies, playing the program's first season, were led by first-year head coach Vic Shealy and compiled a record of 3–4. However, they were not considered a FCS team for scheduling purposes until 2014. They played three home games at Crusader Stadium and one home game at BBVA Compass Stadium. This was an exhibition season for the Huskies. The season did not count against the players academic eligibility, but they also were not eligible for the FCS playoffs. They played a mixed schedule of schools from the NCAA Division I Football Championship Subdivision (FCS), NCAA Division II, and the National Association of Intercollegiate Athletics (NAIA).

The Huskies joined the Southland Conference for the 2014 season and then became eligible for NCAA Division I Football Championship playoffs.

Schedule

Game summaries

Sam Houston State

Sources:

Wayland Baptist

Sources:

Oklahoma Baptist

Sources:

Abilene Christian

Sources:

Incarnate Word

Sources:

Texas College

Sources:

Texas A&M–Commerce

Sources:

Roster

Audio streaming
All Houston Baptist games were streamed online by the Legacy Sports Network.

References

Houston Baptist
Houston Christian Huskies football seasons
Houston Baptist Huskies football